The Malibu Coast is an American Viticulture Area located in the Santa Monica Mountains of western Los Angeles County. The appellation is 46 miles long and eight miles wide, rising from the Pacific Coast to an elevation of 3,111 feet. The National Agricultural Statistics Service's "California Grape Acreage Report Crop 2015" documented the most widely planted varietals in Los Angeles County as Cabernet Sauvignon (69 acres), Syrah (32 acres), Zinfandel (21 acres), Merlot (20 acres), and Chardonnay (10 acres).

The Malibu Coast AVA designation was granted by the Alcohol and Tobacco Tax and Trade Bureau in July, 2014 but wine grapes have grown in the Malibu Coast as far back as 1824, when the first documented vineyard was planted at Rancho Topanga Malibu Sequit by José Bartolomé Tapia. Prior to Prohibition, Los Angeles County was California's largest wine producer by volume. The first modern day vineyard was planted in 1985 by restaurateur Michael McCarty, with the help of Dick Graff of Monterey's Chalone Vineyard. Today the appellation is home to 52 commercial grape growers and 198 acres of vines. Notable producers include Dolin Estate, which initiated the AVA and has twice been named one of the Best 101 wineries in America, Montage Vineyards, Colcanyon Estate Wines and Malibu Sanity.

References 

Food and drink in California
American Viticultural Areas
American Viticultural Areas of California
American Viticultural Areas of Southern California
2014 establishments in California
Santa Monica Mountains